Madhuca betis is a species of flowering plant in the family Sapotaceae. It is found in Indonesia and the Philippines. It is threatened by habitat loss.

References

betis
Vulnerable plants
Taxonomy articles created by Polbot
Taxa named by Francisco Manuel Blanco